František Kubka (1894 in Prague – 1969) was a Czechoslovak writer, journalist, diplomat and politician. He was a regular at the "Friday Men" meetings at Karel Čapek's house from 1921–1938. His folk tale of the romance of Peter Vok with a miller's daughter became the basis of the most popular post-war Czech opera, Zuzana Vojířová. He was appointed ambassador to Bulgaria (1946–49).

References

Czechoslovak male writers
Czechoslovak politicians
Czechoslovak journalists
Diplomats from Prague
Writers from Prague
1894 births
1969 deaths
Ambassadors of Czechoslovakia
Politicians from Prague